Pilodeudorix laticlavia, the Clench's diopetes, is a butterfly in the family Lycaenidae. It is found in Ivory Coast, Ghana and Cameroon. The habitat consists of forests.

References

Butterflies described in 1965
Deudorigini